Arion was a Greek poet.

Arion may also refer to:

Businesses
 Arion Press, a publisher based in San Francisco
 Arion (record label), a French recording company founded in 1962
 Arion Lightning type of an aircraft

Media
 Arion (Matho), a 1714 opera
 Arion (manga), a 1979 manga and an anime movie based on the manga
 Arion (character), a comic book character published by DC Comics

Music
 Arion Baroque Orchestra, Canadian orchestra
 Arion (band), a Finnish metal band
 Arion (record label)
 Arion Band, an American community band
 Arion Gesangverein, a German American musical group
 Arion Music Awards, Greek music awards, organised from 2002 to 2007

People
 Arion (surname)
 Acrion, a Pythagorean philosopher whose name was misread by Valerius Maximus as Arion

Places
 Arion (Crete), a town of ancient Crete
 Arion, Iowa, a town in the United States

Science
 Arion (gastropod), a genus of roundback slugs
 Arion (planet) or 18 Delphini b, an exoplanet

Other uses
 Arion (journal), a journal of humanities and the classics published at Boston University
 Arion (horse), an immortal horse in Greek mythology
 Arion (software), a render engine developed by RandomControl
 MS Arion, a cruise ship
 Arion 1 and Arion 2, rockets under development by PLD Space

See also 
 
 Orion (disambiguation)